Tillandsia recurvispica is a species in the genus Tillandsia. This species is endemic to Bolivia.

References

recurvispica
Flora of Bolivia